Juan Ricardo Faccio Porta (born 1936) is a former Uruguayan football player and manager.

Career
Born in the Jacinto Vera neighborhood of Montevideo, Faccio began playing football as a defender with Club Nacional de Football in the late 1950s. He went on loan to C.A. Fenix and returned to Nacional. Faccio also played for River Plate de Montevideo and Liverpool de Montevideo.

After he retired from playing, Faccio became a football manager and later a sports journalist. He managed local side C.A. Peñarol before moving abroad to manage the El Salvador national football team in 1977 followed by several clubs in Mexico and Colombia. While in Mexico, Faccio managed Coyotes Neza from 1978 to 1982, leading the club for 157 Mexican Primera División matches.

Arrest and imprisonment
In June 2006, Faccio was arrested following a shooting incident outside his home. A 39-year-old man had an altercation with Faccio's daughter earlier in the day, and Faccio shot him in the knee, resulting in the man being taken to the hospital for surgery. Faccio was convicted of causing serious injury aggravated by the use of a weapon and spent three months in prison.

Personal
Faccio's father, Ricardo Faccio, and two of his uncles, Abdón Porte and Roberto Porta, were Uruguayan international footballers.

References

External links
Profile at MedioTiempo

1936 births
Living people
Uruguayan footballers
Uruguayan football managers
El Salvador national football team managers
Peñarol managers
Club Puebla managers
Club León managers
Independiente Santa Fe managers
Association football defenders
River Plate Montevideo managers